The Church of the Holy Archangels, is a church located in the town of Vagharshapat, Armenia, within the complex of the Mother See of Holy Etchmiadzin, adjacent to the Gevorkian Theological Seminary.

History and architecture
The construction of the church was launched in September 2007 by the donation of benefactor Gagik Galstyan and with the design of architect Jim Torosyan. It has a circular shape with a diameter of 15 meters.

It occupies the northeastern corner of the Mother See complex, the area between the Gevorkian Seminary and the Gate of Vazgen I.

The consecration of the church took place on 5 November 2011 by Catholicos Karekin II. The church is mainly used by the deacons and students of the seminary to hold their daily liturgical services and divine worship. However, the church is open for secular worshipers as well.

Gallery

References

Christian monasteries in Armenia
Churches completed in 2011
Tourist attractions in Armavir Province
Armenian Apostolic churches in Vagharshapat
21st-century Oriental Orthodox church buildings
21st-century churches in Armenia